Barclay is a French record company and label founded by Eddie Barclay in 1953.

Eddie Barclay was a bandleader, pianist, producer, and nightclub owner. With his wife, Nicole (the vocalist in his band), he started Barclay. The catalogue included the work of Stéphane Grappelli, Lionel Hampton, and Rhoda Scott. In 1978, 40% of the label was sold to Polygram. Jazz issues ceased in 1983.

Barclay's catalogue includes  Hugues Aufray, Charles Aznavour, Alain Bashung, Jacques Brel, Les Chaussettes Noires, Dalida, Jean Ferrat,  Léo Ferré, Nino Ferrer, Jimi Hendrix, Patrick Juvet, Fela Kuti, Femi Kuti, Danielle Licari, Mireille Mathieu, Mika, Eddy Mitchell, Modjo, Noir Désir, Paradis, Henri Salvador, Emilie Simon, Rachid Taha, the Wild Magnolias and the label is also affiliated with convicted murderer Bertrand Cantat.

Barclay Records is owned and distributed by Universal Music Group.

See also 
List of record labels

References 

Barclay (record label)
French record labels
Jazz record labels
Labels distributed by Universal Music Group
Record labels established in 1953
1953 establishments in France
French brands